Mira Gonzalez (born May 28, 1992) is an American poet. Her first collection, i will never be beautiful enough to make us beautiful together, was published by Spencer Madsen of Sorry House press on January 31, 2013. According to Liza Darwin in Nylon magazine, Gonzalez is part of a "whole new crop of cool girl poets" whose work is "clever, totally unfiltered, and peppered with twisted insight and refreshing humor." She has been published in magazines including Vice, Hobart, and Muumuu House. In 2015, Gonzalez and Tao Lin released Selected Tweets, a collaborative double-book featuring selections from three of her Twitter accounts, as well as visual art and "extras". In 2015, the singer Lily Allen posted an image of her hand above Gonzalez's i will not be beautiful enough... book of poems, which led to speculation that the singer's marriage was on shaky ground. Gonzalez has described her writing process as follows:

She is from Los Angeles, California.

Awards
Dazed & Confused magazine chose i will never be beautiful enough to make us beautiful together as its poetry book of the week, comparing Gonzalez to Tao Lin as a writer with a prolific and intense social media presence. In 2014 the collection was a finalist for The Believer magazine's Poetry Award. Flavorwire, an online culture magazine, named Gonzalez one of "23 People Who Will Make You Care About Poetry in 2013".

Reviews
A review in Rumpus magazine described i will never be beautiful enough to make us beautiful together as about "disconnected sex, anxiety, loneliness, drugs, and depression" but with "cool, effervescent, and clear" observations. In one poem, according to reviewer Emily Bludworth de Barrios, Gonzalez repeats a sequence of words for emphasis, a technique sometimes called anaphora, to emphasize emotion. A review described her writing as having "brutal honesty and minimalist vocabulary and diction." A review in Economy magazine described her poems as having a "studied laboriousness" which was "weirdly compelling." Filmmaker and screenwriter Lena Dunham wrote in The Guardian that the book was one of her favorites for 2014, and that it brings "experimental poetry into the internet age with dark, distinctly female riffs on ambition, depression and love." Reviewer Emma-Lee Moss in The Guardian wrote that Gonzalez's persona is "radical in its contradictions – her voice is both punk and disinterested, both promiscuous and not particularly sexual." The New Inquiry called Gonzalez's poetry "a paragon of flat writing and ambivalence toward emotion" that "conjures an affectively messy universe."

Personal life
Gonzalez is the daughter of visual artist Lora Norton and the stepdaughter of Black Flag bassist Chuck Dukowski. Her mother, stepfather and brother Milo are members of the Chuck Dukowski Sextet.

References

External links 
Mira Gonzalez's Twitter account
Mira Gonzalez at Thought Catalog
Sorry House website

1992 births
Living people
Writers from Los Angeles
American women poets
21st-century American poets
21st-century American women writers